Lumbricillus is a genus of annelids belonging to the family Enchytraeidae.

The genus has cosmopolitan distribution.

Species:
 Lumbricillus aestuum (Stephenson, 1932) 
 Lumbricillus alaricus Shurova, 1974

References

Annelids